Collinet is a surname. Notable people with the surname include:

Dominique Collinet (born 1938), Belgian businessman
Georges Collinet (born 1940?), American broadcaster
Jean-Louis Françoise-Collinet, French chef
Rodolphe Collinet, Belgian businessman